Torn & Burnt – The Mantiis Remixes (2013) is an album by the Barcelonian band Obsidian Kingdom that contains remixes of seven cuts from its previous release, Mantiis, produced by various electronic music artists - Oktopus (Dälek), Subheim, Poordream, Drumcorps, Larvae,  Mothboy, Necro Deathmort and Jr Morgue, many of them signed to the independent German label Ad Noiseam -. The design of the physical edition, looked after by Tomeu Mullet, is based on an original artwork by Belgian taxidermist Raf Veulemans.

Reception

The album receives good reviews that praise its unexpected combination of metal and electronic music. It is proposed that the remixes have their own unique entity  while remaining true to the original songs  and even reaching the point of surpassing them in some cases.

Track listing

References

2013 remix albums
Obsidian Kingdom albums